Juliana Falconieri, O.S.M., (1270 – 19 June 1341) was the Italian foundress of the Religious Sisters of the Third Order of Servites (Mantellate Sisters or the Servite Tertiaries).

Biography
Juliana belonged to the noble Falconieri family of Florence. Her uncle, Alexis Falconieri, was one of the seven founders of the Servite Order. Under his influence, she decided at a young age to follow the consecrated life. After her father's death, she received c. 1285 the habit of the Third Order of the Servites from Philip Benizi, then Prior General of that Order. She remained at home following the rule Benizi had given her until her mother's death, when Juliana and several companions moved into a house of their own in 1305. This became the first convent of the Sisters of the Third Order of Servites. Juliana would serve as Superior until the end of her life.

The Servites' dress consisted of a black gown, secured by a leather girdle, and a white veil. Because the gown had short sleeves to facilitate work, people called the sisters of the new Order "Mantellate." The sisters devoted themselves especially to the care of the sick and other works of mercy. It is said she would often fall in to long moments and hours of ecstacy... She was daily caring for the sick in the streets, homes, and in hospitals and was known for using her own lips to suck out the infection of her patients open sores without fear of contracting any illness. Truly a magnificent act. Juliana directed the community of Servite Tertiaries for 35 years and was more of a servant to her subordinates than a mistress.

A putative miracle mentioned in the liturgical texts for her feast day, is said to have occurred at Juliana's death. At this time, unable to receive Holy Communion because of constant vomiting, she requested the priest to spread a corporal upon her chest and lay the Eucharistic host on it. Shortly thereafter, the host disappeared and Juliana died on 19 June 1341. The image of a cross, just like the one on the host, was found on her breast.

Immediately after her death she was honored as a saint.

The Servite Order was approved by Pope Martin V in the year 1420. Pope Benedict XIII recognized the devotion long paid to her and granted the Servites permission to celebrate the feast of the Blessed Juliana. Pope Clement XII canonized her in the year 1737, and extended the celebration of her feast day (June 19) to the entire Church. Juliana is usually represented in the habit of her Order with a host upon her breast.

See also
 List of Catholic saints

Notes

External links

Founder Statue in St Peter's Basilica
Patron Saints Index: St Juliana Falconieri

1270 births
1341 deaths
Religious leaders from Florence
Servite nuns
Servite tertiaries
Servites
13th-century Italian Roman Catholic religious sisters and nuns
Founders of Catholic religious communities
14th-century Italian Roman Catholic religious sisters and nuns
Burials in Florence
13th-century Christian saints
14th-century Christian saints
Christian female saints of the Middle Ages
Canonizations by Pope Clement XII
Beatifications by Pope Innocent XI